The Dickey Club, often referred to as "The Dickey Tradition" or simply “The Dickey” (sometimes spelled “Dickie”), was a private social club at Harvard University, originally founded in 1851 as a chapter of the Delta Kappa Epsilon fraternity. The Club included members such as former U.S. President Theodore Roosevelt, newspaper magnate William Randolph Hearst, and financier J.P. Morgan Jr. The Dickey was absorbed by the Hasty Pudding Club in 1924.

History 
The history of The Dickey Club stretches back to 1844 when Delta Kappa Epsilon (DKE) fraternity was founded at Yale University. At the time, social societies at Yale were class-based, with certain societies reserved for seniors, and others reserved for juniors, sophomores, and freshmen. Upon its founding at Yale, DKE followed the convention of the other societies at the time, making itself a junior-class society from which the senior-class secret societies such as Skull and Bones, Scroll and Key, and Wolf's Head would select their members.

When DKE expanded to Harvard in 1851, it quickly morphed into its own semi-independent sophomore society known as The Dickey, while still maintaining its status as an affiliated DKE chapter on paper.

The 19th century Harvard social ecosystem was multi-tiered, in which students at the beginning of their sophomore year who were deemed to be the "social elite" were invited to join the Institute of 1770. The Institute of 1770 was the first rung on the Harvard social ladder, comprising the top 100 students at Harvard in terms of their social standing as determined by their peers. At the beginning of each new year, the former Institute of 1770 (who were now juniors) would vote for who they believed were the top 10 most socially elite in the new sophomore class. Those top 10 would then vote among themselves for who they believed to be the next 10 below them. Those 10 would then vote for who they believed to be the next 10. This pattern would repeat until the top 100 students in the sophomore class had been selected and ranked. These 100 newly selected members of the sophomore class then became the new Institute of 1770.

From the Institute of 1770, those who ranked high enough were granted acceptance into The Dickey Club, from which the Waiting Clubs (junior societies) and Final Clubs (senior societies) would then "punch" their members.

In 1890, unimpressed with the Harvard chapter's general lack of interest in maintaining their alliance with fellow DKE chapters, The Dickey Club was threatened with disaffiliation from the national Delta Kappa Epsilon fraternity. The Dickey Club sent a delegation to the annual DKE convention to discuss their continued affiliation, at which time several requirements were set by the national organization for the club to retain their status as an affiliated DKE chapter; specifically, The Dickey Club would be required to officially recognize DKE members from other chapters. Due, however, to The Dickey Club's unique selection process and role in the Harvard social ecosystem, The Dickey Club refused to acknowledge non-Harvard DKE's as being equal to Dickey members, thus ceasing any association with Delta Kappa Epsilon fraternity, and continuing on as an independent Harvard social club.

Following an official merger with the Institute of 1770, in 1924, the amalgamated "Institute of 1770, D. K. E." merged with the Hasty Pudding Club.

Initiation Ritual 
As with most secret societies, little is known about the initiation rituals of The Dickey Club, and references to it are few and far between. What is known is that at one point there appears to have been two phases of initiation into The Dickey Club; a public phase, followed by a private ritual.

According to an article published in The Cambridge Tribune, the public phase of the initiation lasted a full week, and seemed to constitute fairly standard hazing-type practices. The first night included stripping initiates down to just their pants and having them run by current members while they are slapped and punched; a practice known as “running the gauntlet”. After the first night, “[t]he members-elect are made to wear sneakers, a flannel suit and shirt and must go without their hats, no matter what the season of the year. For five long days and nights they wear these clothes, and for this eternity they must never be seen walking. They must always run – run to lectures, run to lunch, run to their rooms, run to their dinners, run everywhere, run here for one member, run there for another. Hence the terms “running for the Dickie.”

Once the public phase of the initiation was complete, the neophytes were officially inducted into The Dickey Club in a private ritual. The only known first-hand account of the private portion of the initiation ritual comes from the memoirs of Julian Hawthorne, the son of Nathaniel Hawthorne.

Julian Hawthorne writes that he was initiated into The Dickey Club on the evening of May 18, 1864. “I was initiated into a college secret society—a couple of hours of grotesque and good-humored rodomontade and horseplay, in which I cooperated as in a kind of pleasant nightmare, confident, even when branded with a red-hot iron or doused head-over heels in boiling oil, that it would come out all right. The neophyte is effectively blindfolded during the proceedings, and at last, still sightless, I was led down flights of steps into a silent crypt, and helped into a coffin, where I was to stay until the Resurrection.”

After lying in the coffin for a while, Julian states that he was visited by an older classmate dressed as a “friendly demon”, with whom he had a conversation, and that “After a while he went away and I lay in peace: until a bevy of roistering friends arrived, hoisted me out, hurried me up the steps, snatched off bandages, and lo! I was in a brightly lighted room filled with jolly fellows who were shaking hands with me, giving me the ‘grip,’ and leading me to a large bowl brimming with claret punch.”

It is interesting to note that the ritual of being led into a crypt and then lying in a coffin mirrors the initiation ritual of the Yale secret society Skull and Bones.

In the book Fleshing Out Skull & Bones, the grandson of DKE and Skull and Bones member Clifton Samuel Thomas stated, “I have always felt there was a very, very close connection between The Order [Skull and Bones] and DKE.” It is believed by some that the Delta Kappa Epsilon fraternity at Yale acted as a feeder club into Skull and Bones, and the vestiges of the Skull and Bones rituals continued on with The Dickey Club at Harvard.

Notable Members 

Theodore Roosevelt
 Franklin D. Roosevelt
 J. P. Morgan Jr.
 William Randolph Hearst
 Owen Wister
 Thomas W. Lamont
 Lathrop Brown
Joseph P. Kennedy Sr.
 Julian Hawthorne
 Dwight F. Davis
 August Belmont Jr.
 R. L. Agassiz
 George Von L. Meyer
 Bradley Palmer
 Charles Francis Adams III
 William J. Bingham (Former Harvard Athletics Director)
 Theodore Roosevelt Jr.
 Harry Elkins Widener
Leverett Saltonstall
 Larz Anderson
 Robert Bacon
 Robert Todd Lincoln
 Henry Cabot Lodge
 Nicholas Longworth
 Marshall Newell
 Edward Knoblock
 Powers Hapgood

See also 

 Harvard College Social Clubs
 Collegiate secret societies in North America
 A.D. Club (1836)
 Delphic Club (1846)
 Fly Club (1836)
 Owl Club (1896)
 Phoenix S.K. Club (1895)
 Porcellian Club (1791)
 Fox Club (1898)

References 

Harvard University
American secret societies
Delta Kappa Epsilon